Top-seeds Ken Flach and Robert Seguso won the title for the second successive year, beating second-seeded pair Pavel Složil and Kim Warwick in the final.

Seeds
The top four seeds received a bye into the second round. A champion seed is indicated in bold text while text in italics indicates the round in which that seed was eliminated.

Draw

Finals

Top half

Bottom half

References

External links

1985 Grand Prix (tennis)
Men's Doubles